Kentucky Route 363 (KY 363) is a  state highway in the U.S. state of Kentucky. The highway connects mostly rural areas of Laurel County with Keavy and London.

Route description
KY 363 begins at an intersection with KY 312 (Laurel Lake Road) in Keavy, in the southwestern part of Laurel County. It travels to the north-northeast and passes Locust Grove Cemetery. It curves to the east-northeast and begins a concurrency with KY 552. The two highways head to the northeast and curve to the north-northwest. When they split, KY 363 turns to the right, to the east-southeast, and curves to the northeast. It crosses over Campbell Branch and curves to the east-northeast. After crossing over Horse Branch, it travels to the north-northeast and then curves to the northeast. It crosses over Ward Branch and curves to a northerly direction, where it begins to parallel Interstate 75 (I-75). The highway travels through Pine Grove. It crosses over Lick Branch and passes Wyan–Pine Grove Elementary School. It curves to the northeast and travels on an overpass that crosses over I-75. The highway intersects the northern terminus of KY 3429 (Philpot Road) and then crosses over Cloyd and Sampson branches. On the southwestern edge of London, it intersects KY 1006 (Old Whitley Road) at a roundabout. Immediately after this, KY 363 heads to the north-northeast and enters London proper. It intersects KY 192 and then enters downtown London. It curves to the northeast and intersects the northern terminus of KY 2391 (South Dixie Street). The highway continues to the northeast and meets its northern terminus, an intersection with U.S. Route 25 (US 25; South Main Street).

Major intersections

See also

References

0363
Transportation in Laurel County, Kentucky
London, Kentucky micropolitan area